Physical Evidence is a 1989 American crime thriller film directed by Michael Crichton (in his final film as a director), and starring Burt Reynolds, Theresa Russell and Ned Beatty.

Plot
After parking his car and wearing a "Happy Now?" sign, a man finds extortionist Jake Farley lying under the bridge. He grabs his foot with the rope and discovers he is dead.

Meanwhile, beleaguered ex-police officer Joe Paris wakes up with a splitting headache and blood on his shirt after a night of drinking, and cannot recall events of the previous night. His blood is discovered on the murder weapon planted at the apartment and he is arrested by detectives. Public defender Jenny Hudson is assigned to meet and represent Joe. Investigating the case, Joe and Jenny arrive at the bar, where Joe meets Jake's son, Matt, who, believing Joe killed his father, has an employee tell them to leave. Joe and Jenny leave the bar, and see what seems to be a policeman watching them. They attempt to give chase, but a near head-on collision forces them to abandon their tail.

Deborah Quinn, with whom Joe was having an affair, tells Jenny that Joe was with her the night of the murder, but she fears her husband, Vincent, a violent crime boss. Joe, believing an old nemesis, Harry Norton, may be involved, tracks him down at his business. But it turns out Norton was out of the country with his new wife.

It is revealed at the trial that Farley was disliked by nearly everyone. Farley taped his conversations with people, including Joe, and many of the tapes contained incriminating evidence he was using to blackmail people, including police officers.

A convict named Tony Sklar contacts Jenny and tells her he has evidence that could clear Joe, but he would tell her only in exchange for a deal to lessen his sentence. She visits him in the hospital infirmary and tells her he was hired by Norton to kill Farley and his new wife, Celeste, who had been married to Norton, before Norton was incarcerated. Norton blamed Joe, who had arrested him when Joe was a police officer. Before a deal can be finalized, though, Norton has Sklar killed in prison.

However, Joe doctors a tape of Sklar to make Norton believe he is still alive. Norton comes to exact revenge and find Sklar, killing three police officers and shooting Joe, before finding Jenny. Norton confesses to arranging Farley's murder and pinning it on Joe, believing he could fulfill two vendettas at once. Jenny tells him that she can take him to Sklar. Jenny kills Norton and reunites with Joe outside the building.

Cast
 Burt Reynolds as Joe Paris
 Theresa Russell as Jenny Hudson
 Ned Beatty as James Nicks
 Kay Lenz as Deborah Quinn
 Ted McGinley as Kyle
 Tom O'Brien as Matt Farley
 Kenneth Welsh as Harry Norton

Production
The film was originally conceived as a sequel to Jagged Edge and was meant to have Glenn Close and Robert Loggia reprise their roles. The story was about a private investigator framed for murder and the female lawyer who defends him. The project was developed at Columbia Pictures but then head of production Guy McElwaine was replaced by David Puttnam, who, according to producer Martin Ransohoff, said that he did not want to make sequels (Puttnam denied this, saying his problem was the script "wasn't good and for no other reason... when there's a terrific script for Jagged Edge II Columbia will be anxious to make it".). Ransohoff decided to turn the script into an original story. "It's a good mystery on its own terms", he said. "I think the story is really more effective as an original. Because there wasn't an agreement with Loggia and Close, we had always designed the project to go either as a sequel or on its own terms."

The film was distributed by Columbia Pictures between in the United States and Canada, with Rank Film Distributors handling foreign distribution. The film was produced by Martin Ransohoff who formed with Columbia, Rank Film Distributors and Vestron Video in 1986.

The male lead went to Burt Reynolds, after starring in Switching Channels. "Joe is a ballsy character", said Reynolds, "kind of like Dirty Harry gone amok. He's around the edge of having a nervous breakdown but he has a strange sense of humor about it all."

It was filmed in Boston, Massachusetts, and around Canada between Toronto and Montreal, and began production in September 1987. It was filmed under the working title Smoke.

Russell later recalled her part "was a little more difficult than I thought it would be, being someone who was that in control. Michael Crichton, who is a doctor -- and his ex-wife is a lawyer -- was very helpful in that regard. I always felt I wasn't doing anything. It was happening inside, but I didn't feel it would show. But they'd say, `No, if anything, do less.' You can't show your emotions when you're in that lawyer mode. With me (Crichton) was very specific. I had to rely on him a little more than I normally do (on a director) because I was so unsure of that thing of it being so controlled. He had a lot of pre-conceived ideas of how this was supposed to be -- and he was probably right. A couple of times I tried to try to be jokier, funnier, 'cause I felt so boring all the time. Everybody else got to do all this fun stuff and then I tried it and he said, `No, don't do that.' So I said, `Print it. I'd just like to see it.' And then we'd watch it and I'd turn around and say, `You're right, you're right. God, burn it! It just stinks!' So, I just kind of had to prove that to myself."

Reception
The film was described by the Chicago Tribune as a "feeble thriller... the worst case of filmmaking-by-numbers, reflecting not an ounce of commitment or conviction". The Los Angeles Times called it "flat and remote... a thriller that doesn't thrill." On Rotten Tomatoes, the film had a rating of 22% from 18 reviews.

References

External links
 
 
 
 

1989 films
1980s crime thriller films
American crime thriller films
Films directed by Michael Crichton
Films set in Boston
American courtroom films
Columbia Pictures films
Films scored by Henry Mancini
American police detective films
1980s English-language films
1980s American films